The Dry Creek Valley AVA is an American Viticultural Area in Sonoma County, California, located northwest of the town of Healdsburg. The appellation benefits from the proximity of the Lake Sonoma reservoir for irrigation in this relatively dry area.

History 

At the turn of the 20th century, Dry Creek Valley was one of California's most prominent producers of Zinfandel.  During Prohibition, much of the valley was converted to plum, pear, and prune trees, and much of the fruit was processed by Sunsweet Growers in Healdsburg.  Since the resurgence of wine grape production in the 1970s, Cabernet Sauvignon and Zinfandel have become the most planted varieties, and Dry Creek Valley AVA has become one of the state's top Zinfandel producers.  Sauvignon blanc has become the most important white grape varietal produced in the valley.

Wineries 
Over 50 wineries are resident in Dry Creek Valley AVA, and over 160 wineries produce wines that bear a Dry Creek Valley AVA designation.  Dry Creek Valley AVA is home to the majority of the Sonoma vineyards of E & J Gallo Winery, who established winery facilities in the valley in the early 1990s.

See also
 Sonoma County wine
 Wine Country (California)

References

External links
 
 

American Viticultural Areas
American Viticultural Areas of the San Francisco Bay Area
Geography of Sonoma County, California
1983 establishments in California